NGC 4076 is a spiral galaxy located 290 million light-years away in the constellation Coma Berenices. The galaxy was discovered by astronomer William Herschel on April 27, 1785 and is a member of the NGC 4065 Group.

NGC 4076 is classified as a LINER galaxy.

NGC 4076 has been host to two type Ia supernovae. The first, SN 2007M was first observed on December 24, 2006. However, it was discovered on January 14, 2007. The second, SN 2011bc was discovered on April 1, 2011.

References

External links

4076
038209
Coma Berenices
Astronomical objects discovered in 1785
Spiral galaxies
NGC 4065 Group
LINER galaxies
07061
Discoveries by William Herschel